Hendrik Christiaan Crafford Krüger (born 6 May 1962) is a South African politician, currently the Shadow Deputy Minister of Small Business Development and a Member of Parliament (MP) for the opposition Democratic Alliance.

Education
Krüger holds a postgraduate diploma in Business Management and is currently pursuing a Master of Business Administration.

Political career
He served as a Democratic Alliance councillor in the Emalahleni Local Municipality of Mpumalanga from 2006 to 2014.

Parliamentary career
Krüger stood as a DA parliamentary candidate from Mpumalanga in the 2014 national elections, and was subsequently elected to the National Assembly and sworn in on 21 May 2014. On 5 June 2014, he was appointed Shadow Deputy Minister of Small Business Development in the new shadow cabinet led by Mmusi Maimane. Krüger became a member of the Portfolio Committee on Small Business Development on 20 June.

Between 17 September 2015 and 8 December 2016, he was an alternate member of the Portfolio Committee on Agriculture, Forestry and Fisheries. Krüger returned to the committee on 2 March 2017 and served until the dissolution of the parliamentary term on 7 May 2019.

After the general election on 8 May 2019, Krüger was selected to return to the National Assembly. He was reappointed as Shadow Deputy Minister of Small Business Development on 5 June 2019 by Maimane.

In March 2020, parliament published a notice of Krüger's intention to introduce the Ease of Doing Business Bill, a private member bill from the DA, which aims to develop a plan to reduce red tape for businesses that want the enter the market place. Amid the COVID-19 pandemic in South Africa, he called for the re-opening of Pilates, yoga and other studios in July 2020. In December 2020, he was reappointed as Shadow Deputy Minister of Small Business Development in the shadow cabinet of the newly elected DA leader, John Steenhuisen.

Personal life
Krüger has been a resident of Witbank for more than 30 years.

References

Living people
1962 births
Place of birth missing (living people)
People from Emalahleni Local Municipality, Mpumalanga
Afrikaner people
Democratic Alliance (South Africa) politicians
Members of the National Assembly of South Africa